Samantha Elizabeth Giles (born 2 July 1971) is an English actress and author. She is known for portraying the role of Bernice Blackstock in the ITV soap opera Emmerdale. She had also portrayed Sally Boothe in the ITV drama series Where the Heart Is and Valerie Holden in the Channel 4 soap opera Hollyoaks Coronation Street as Kirsty .She departed from Emmerdale in 2019 to focus on other creative projects, such as writing her debut novel, Rosemary and the Witches of Pendle Hill, released in August 2020. In April 2021, it was confirmed that she would be returning to Emmerdale. In October 2021 she had a sequel to her first book published called "Rosemary and the Book of the Dead". Giles describes her beliefs as Wiccan.

Career
From 1998 to 2002, and again in 2004, Giles portrayed the role of Bernice Blackstock in the ITV soap opera Emmerdale. For her role as Bernice, she won the TV Quick Award for Best Actress. Giles' other television credits include Doctors, Dangerfield and Midnight Man. Her stage credits include A Taste of Honey (as Helen), Dead Funny (Lisa), and Season's Greetings (Belinda). In December 2007, it was announced that Giles was to join the cast of the Channel 4 soap opera Hollyoaks in 2008 as Valerie Holden, a role that was taken over from actress Jacqueline Leonard. She returned in July 2010, and left again in August 2010. In December 2010, Giles appeared on Celebrity Mastermind where her specialist subject was  the works of Alfred Hitchcock. Giles returned to Emmerdale in 2012. However, in 2019, Giles announced her departure from the series to focus on other creative projects. In August 2020, her first book, titled Rosemary and the Witches of Pendle Hill, was published. After Emmerdale producers offered a return to Giles in 2021, she accepted; her return scenes aired on 27 May.

Filmography

Stage
 1993, Rosalind in Double D directed by June Brown
 2004, Jennifer in Party Piece at the Theatre Royal Windsor directed by Mark Piper
 2010, Marge in Absent Friends at the Oldham Coliseum/Harrogate/Anvil Arts Production directed by Nikolai Foster
 2007, Lisa in Dead Fully at the Oldham Coliseum and National Tour directed by Nikolai Foster
 2006, Helen in A Taste of Honey - National Tour at the Oldham Coliseum directed by Stuart Wood
 2006, Belinda in Seasons Greetings at the Liverpool Playhouse directed by Nikolai Foster

Awards and nominations

References

External links 
 

1971 births
Living people
20th-century English actresses
20th-century English novelists
20th-century English women writers
21st-century English actresses
21st-century English novelists
21st-century English women writers
Actresses from Kent
English soap opera actresses
English stage actresses
English television actresses
English women novelists
People from Maidstone